The Kaohsiung Music Center (KMC) is a music hall in Yancheng District and Lingya District in Kaohsiung, Taiwan.

History
In 2009, the Executive Yuan recognized the need to establish a music center in Kaohsiung. The Council for Cultural Affairs then commissioned Kaohsiung City Government to plan, design, and construct the center. The center was officially opened on 31 October 2021 in a ceremony attended by President Tsai Ing-wen and Culture Minister Lee Yung-te.

Architecture
The center was designed by Spanish architecture firm MADE IN.

See also
 List of tourist attractions in Taiwan

References

External links

 
 

2021 establishments in Taiwan
Buildings and structures in Kaohsiung
Concert halls in Taiwan
Event venues established in 2021
Lingya District
Tourist attractions in Kaohsiung
Postmodern architecture in Taiwan